Association "Polish Community" is a Polish non-governmental and public benefit organization operating under the patronage of the Polish Senate; dedicated to strengthening the ties between Poland and Polonia - Poles and people of Polish origin living abroad. The current chairman is Longin Komołowski since June 2010.

It was founded in 1990 by Andrzej Stelmachowski, professor of Wrocław University and Warsaw University, then-Sejm marshal, later Minister of Education, and until his death in April 2009, presidential advisor. Maciej Płażyński was the president of the association from May 11, 2008 until his death on April 10, 2010.

The organization receives sponsorship from Polish government.

See also 
World Polonia Games

External links
 Homepage

Polish diaspora organizations
Cultural organisations based in Poland
Organizations established in 1990
1990 establishments in Poland